1971 Emperor's Cup Final was the 51st final of the Emperor's Cup competition. The final was played at National Stadium in Tokyo on January 1, 1972. Mitsubishi Motors won the championship.

Overview
Mitsubishi Motors won their 1st title, by defeating defending champion Yanmar Diesel 3–1.

Match details

See also
1971 Emperor's Cup

References

Emperor's Cup
1971 in Japanese football
Urawa Red Diamonds matches
Cerezo Osaka matches